Sin Límite may refer to:

 Sin Límite (Ednita Nazario album), 2001
 Sin Límite (Magnate & Valentino album), 2004